The 2005 ASEAN Futsal Championship was the third edition of the tournament.  It was held in Bangkok, Thailand from 2 May to 7 May 2005.

Group stage

Fifth/Sixth place

Third/Fourth place

Final

Champions

References 
2005 schedule & results – ASEAN Football Federation
ASEAN Futsal Championship 2005 - Rec.Sport.Soccer Statistics Foundation
3rd ASEAN Futsal Championship 2005 - Futsal Planet

External links
 Old website (Archived)
 Official website

AFF Futsal Championship
Futsal Championship, 2005
2005
2005 in Asian futsal
Fut